Linn (Ward 1) is one of the 23 wards of Glasgow City Council. There are 4 councillors for the area; as of 19 November 2022, it is represented by the Scottish National Party and Scottish Labour, who have two councillors each.

History 
In September 2022, Councillor Malcolm Cunning died. A by-election was called for 17 November.

Boundaries
The southernmost ward of Glasgow, Linn includes the areas of Castlemilk, Croftfoot and Simshill, those parts of Cathcart, King's Park and Muirend that are south and east of the Cathcart Circle Lines, and the separate village of Carmunnock. The ward also contains Linn Park and the Cathkin Braes. The boundaries have remained unchanged since the creation of the ward in 2007.

Demographics
According to the 2011 census, the ethnicity of the population is:

Councillors

Election results

2022 by-election 
A by-election was held on 17 November 2022 to replace Malcolm Cunning.

2022 election
2022 Glasgow City Council election

2017 election
2017 Glasgow City Council election

2012 election
2012 Glasgow City Council election

2007 election
2007 Glasgow City Council election

See also
Wards of Glasgow

References

External links
Listed Buildings in Linn Ward, Glasgow City at British Listed Buildings

Wards of Glasgow